Permanent residency (PR) in Canada is a status granting someone who is not a  Canadian citizen the right to live and work in Canada without any time limit on their stay. To become a permanent resident a foreign national must apply to Immigration, Refugees and Citizenship Canada (IRCC), formerly known as Citizenship and Immigration Canada, under one of several programs. In addition to the conferred right of abode in Canada, a primary benefit of permanent residency is the eligibility to apply for Canadian citizenship after a certain period of permanent residency.

Benefits of permanent residence 
A Permanent Resident holds many of the same rights and responsibilities as a Canadian citizen, including the right to live, work (subject to some restrictions), and study in any province or territory of Canada. Permanent residents participate in many of the same social benefits that Canadian citizens receive, including becoming contributing members of the Canada Pension Plan and receiving coverage by their province or territory's universal health care system. All Permanent Residents may avail themselves of the rights, freedoms, and protections of the Canadian Charter of Rights and Freedoms, other than those exclusively granted to citizens.

Permanent Residents may apply for Canadian citizenship after living in Canada for a certain amount of time. Currently, a person must have been living in Canada as a Permanent Resident for three years (1095 days) out of the five years preceding their application (with up to one year of the time before becoming a permanent resident included). They also have the right to sponsor relatives for permanent residence, subject to fulfilling residence criteria and assurance of support requirements.

Restrictions
Permanent residents do not have the right to vote in elections in Canada nor can they run for elected office in any level of government. Several municipal governments in Canada—including Toronto, Vancouver, Halifax, and Calgary—have proposed giving permanent residents the right to vote in municipal elections but that would require approval from their respective provincial governments. For national security reasons, permanent residents also cannot hold jobs in either the public or private sectors that require a high-level security clearance.

As non-citizens, permanent residents must use the passport of their current nationality in combination with a permanent resident card for international travel because they cannot be issued Canadian passports. Some countries will grant visa-free entry to Canadian permanent residents even if their current nationality would not typically qualify. To re-enter Canada on a commercial carrier (flight, bus, etc) a permanent resident must present either their permanent resident card or a Permanent Resident Travel Document issued by a Canadian diplomatic office.

The Canadian government has announced a ban on foreign nationals from buying residential properties in the country, effective January 1, 2023. This decision was made in response to surging property prices in the country and aims to give local residents access to affordable housing. The ban will last for 2 years. The new law is a part of the Canadian government's budget proposals and the minister of housing and diversity and inclusion has stated that homes should not be commodities but rather a place for families to live and build a life together.

Loss of status
A permanent resident must live in Canada for two years out of every five, or risk losing that status. Time spent travelling with a Canadian spouse, on a business trip for a Canadian business, or working for a federal or provincial government office abroad can be included in the calculation.

Permanent residents also risk loss for serious crimes (those that may be punished by more than 10 years in Canada or actually being imprisoned for more than 6 months in Canada), being a security risk or associated with organized crime.

Failing to meet the residency or admissibility requirements above results in loss of permanent residence status when the finding becomes final without appeal, if the finding is made outside Canada, and upon the person being issued a departure order from Canada, if the finding is made inside Canada.

A person automatically loses permanent residence status upon becoming a Canadian citizen.

A permanent resident may also voluntarily renounce their status if the person possesses a citizenship or right of abode in another country. A person who gives up their status inside Canada must depart the country or apply for a temporary resident visa.

A permanent resident does not lose their status if their permanent resident card expires.

Permanent resident card 

Immigration, Refugees and Citizenship Canada (then known as Citizenship and Immigration Canada) began issuing the permanent resident card, commonly known as a "PR card", to all new Canadian permanent residents in 2002 as part of security improvements following the September 11 attacks.  All existing permanent residents were given the option of applying for a permanent resident card at a cost of $50, though possessing a card is not mandatory except in the case of international travel. From December 31, 2003, every permanent resident must be able to present his or her permanent resident card upon boarding a commercial carrier (aircraft, train, bus or boat) in order to travel to Canada. As the permanent resident card may be issued only in Canada, those permanent residents who are outside Canada and without a permanent resident card may apply for a single-use Permanent Resident Travel Document from the nearest Canadian diplomatic office.

The permanent resident card expires every five years, and then may be renewed by making application and proving that the applicant has been physically present in Canada for the requisite time period, or has otherwise satisfied the residency requirements. Although an individual may meet the residency requirements by living outside of Canada with a Canadian citizen spouse, or working outside Canada for a Canadian business, the Permanent Resident Card cannot be renewed without being present in Canada and having a Canadian address.

While the PR card was introduced to facilitate ease of travel for permanent residents, it can also be used as a convenient method of proving status to government authorities, employers and school.

Benefits of Having PR 

 Free healthcare like other citizens
 Free education for children. 
 Freedom to work/move/study anywhere in Canada’s provinces that Canada offers.
 Protection under Canadian law and Charters of Rights & Freedom. 
 Right to apply for Canadian Citizenship.

Landed immigrant
Landed immigrant is an old classification for a person who has been admitted to Canada as a non-Canadian citizen permanent resident; the classification which is now known simply as "permanent resident". The term landed immigrant has been in use for so long that it is still (15 years later) part of the Canadian vocabulary and still appears in some government publications and forms.

To become a landed immigrant from outside Canada, one had to legally enter Canada, or 'land', at one of the designated ports of entry. Upon entry, the immigrant's passport was to be stamped with the words "Immigrant Landed". Once the immigrant had landed, an IMM 1000 form (Record of Landing or Confirmation of Permanent Residence) was to be given to provide an official record of landed status.

Application for permanent residency
A person can become a Permanent Resident either by applying outside Canada or inside Canada. While the "Application Status" web application on the IRCC website reflects this by showing different processing times, the differences and consequences for the applicant are not clearly identified.

 An application by a temporary resident, applying as a "Spouse or Common-law partner in Canada", "Live-in caregiver", "protected person" or "permit holder", from within Canada is referred to as a "Within Canada" (or "inland") application.
 All other applications are "Outside Canada" (or "outland") applications processed by visa offices outside Canada.

Processing times are published weekly on the IRCC website.

Outside Canada or outland applications

In January 2015, the Government of Canada opened a new system for managing economic applications for permanent residence: Express Entry. Canada’s Express Entry system is an online system managing Canadian permanent residence applications from foreign skilled workers. 

The skilled workers are chosen taking into account their skills and how far they can make a positive contribution to the Canadian economy.

See also 
 Immigration to Canada
 Canada immigration statistics
 Canadian nationality law
 Immigration, Refugees and Citizenship Canada
 Canada Permanent Resident Card
 Temporary resident (Canada)
 Green card (United States permanent resident)

References
What is the difference between a Canada PR & Canada Citizenship? November 2022

Further reading

External links

 Citizenship and Immigration Canada
 Information for Newcomers
 Applying for citizenship
 
 Permanent Resident Card

Canadian immigration law
Residency